Gabriel C. Spalding is an American physicist.

Spalding studied physics and mathematics at Washington University in St. Louis, graduating in 1983. Seven years later, he completed a doctorate in applied physics at Harvard University. In 1996, Spalding joined the Illinois Wesleyan University faculty. In 2014, Spalding received several honors. The SPIE and American Physical Society both elected him to fellow status. The APS additionally awarded Spalding the Jonathan F. Reichert and Barbara Wolff-Reichert Award for Excellence in Advanced Laboratory Instruction, and the American Association of Physics Teachers named him one of four recipients of its Homer L. Dodge Citations for Distinguished Service that year.

References

Fellows of the American Physical Society
Fellows of SPIE
20th-century American physicists
21st-century American physicists
Harvard University alumni
Washington University in St. Louis alumni
Living people
Year of birth missing (living people)
Illinois Wesleyan University faculty